Georgetown station is a former commuter rail station on the Danbury Division of the New York, New Haven, and Hartford Railroad, located in Georgetown, Connecticut. It was in service from 1852 to 1970. A new station at Georgetown has been proposed.

History
Georgetown station was opened in 1852 on the Danbury and Norwalk Railroad. The station was located on the east side of the single track in the section of Georgetown that lies within the Town of Wilton. In 1899, the original depot caught fire. The damage to the depot was so severe that about 40 feet of the large depot had to be demolished, resulting in separated freight and passenger station buildings.  The station building was home to a grocery store and a post office. A new station was opened in late 1908. The station would continue to serve passengers until its closure by the Penn Central in 1970.

There is possibility of a new Georgetown station in the future. A future plan by ConnDOT, which would include re-electrification of the Danbury Branch, also includes the possibility of a new  Georgetown station.

References

External links

Stations along New York, New Haven and Hartford Railroad lines
Former railway stations in Connecticut
Buildings and structures in Wilton, Connecticut
1852 establishments in Connecticut
1972 disestablishments in Connecticut
Proposed railway stations in the United States
Railroad stations in Fairfield County, Connecticut
Buildings and structures in Redding, Connecticut